Greenshields is a hamlet in central Alberta, Canada within the Municipal District of Wainwright No. 61.

The community has the name of E. B. Greenshields, a railroad official.

Demographics 
The population of Greenshields according to the 2007 municipal census conducted by the Municipal District of Wainwright No. 61 is 80.

See also 
List of communities in Alberta
List of hamlets in Alberta

References 

Hamlets in Alberta
Municipal District of Wainwright No. 61